Hannah Fielding is a contemporary Romance fiction writer. Her second book, The Echoes of Love, won a 2014 Gold IPPY Award for Romance and the Silver Medal for Romance at the 2014 Foreword Reviews IndieFab Book Awards, a paid vanity award. Her third novel, Indiscretion, was named the Gold Winner in the Fiction: Romance Category of the 2015 USA Best Book Awards. It also won Gold at the 2016 Benjamin Franklin Awards. Indiscretion is the first novel in the Andalucian Nights Trilogy. The second part, Masquerade, was published in 2015 as well, and the third part, "Legacy" was published in summer 2016.

Publications

Awards 
 2021, American Fiction Award: Romance Category, Song of the Nile
 The Echoes of Love won the Gold Medal for Romance at the 2014 Independent Publisher Book Awards as well as the Silver Medal for Romance at the 2014 Foreword Reviews IndieFab Book Awards. 
 Indiscretion, Gold Winner in the Fiction: Romance Category of the 2015 USA Best Book Awards. Indiscretion also won Gold and Masquerade Silver for Romance at the 2016 Benjamin Franklin Awards.
 Aphrodite's Tears won Best Romance at the International Book Awards, the National Indie Excellence Awards, the American Fiction Awards and the NABE Pinnacle Book Achievement Awards.''

References

External links
 
 
 
 

Egyptian romantic fiction writers
Women romantic fiction writers
Egyptian novelists
Living people
Year of birth missing (living people)